is a Japanese professional wrestler better known simply as . He is best known for his work in All Japan Pro Wrestling, where he is a former record eight-time Triple Crown Heavyweight Champion and a seven-time World Tag Team Champion. He is also part of the promotion's board of directors.

Professional wrestling career

All Japan Pro Wrestling

Early days (2004–2006) 
Suwama was scouted and recruited to All Japan Pro Wrestling (AJPW) by Hiroshi Hase, particularly because of his amateur wrestling background. He joined the All Japan dojo on March 1, 2004, and teamed with AJPW president Keiji Mutoh early in his career, defeating many of his seniors. In 2005, he defeated Muto in the 2005 Champion Carnival.

Voodoo Murders (2006–2008) 
Suwama aligned himself with the Voodoo Murders stable on January 8, 2006, following a Triple Crown Heavyweight Championship match between Satoshi Kojima and stable leader Taru. Upon joining the group, he officially changed his name to Suwama, which translates to "Suwa evil spirit".

He formed a team with RO'Z in early 2007, as the two set their sights on the vacant World Tag Team Championship. Their pursuit would be unsuccessful, as Toshiaki Kawada and Taiyō Kea defeated them in a decision match for the vacant belts on February 17, 2007. Suwama was sent by the group to Orlando, Florida on July 2, 2007, in order to secure Total Nonstop Action Wrestling star Scott Steiner for All Japan's Pro Wrestling Love in Ryogoku, Vol. 3 event in Sumo Hall on August 26, 2007. Suwama had observed Steiner's match and shortly afterwards came to an agreement with Steiner to team with him and challenge the team of The Great Muta and Tajiri. They were unsuccessful in the challenge.

For the rest of the year, Suwama mainly competed in six-man tags with Taru and Satoshi Kojima (who joined the group in July), but also had a short feud with rookie gaijin Joe Doering. Suwama teamed with Kojima in the 2008 World's Strongest Tag Determination League, where they defeated Toshiaki Kawada and Kensuke Sasaki to reach the finals, but lost to Keiji Mutoh and Joe Doering. Suwama and Kojima scored 10 points.

All Japan Ace (2008–present) 
At All Japan's New Year's Shining Series show on January 3, 2008, Suwama saved Keiji Mutoh and Joe Doering from a post-match attack by the Voodoo Murders stable. After Suwama tore off his Voodoo Murders shirt, he shook hands with Mutoh and signaled his return to the All Japan Seikigun. On March 1, 2008, Suwama defeated Taru at Pro Wrestling Love in Ryogoku, Vol. 4. From April 5–9, Suwama participated in All Japan's annual Champion Carnival tournament, which he ultimately won on April 9 by defeating New Japan Pro-Wrestling (NJPW) star Hiroshi Tanahashi in the finals. Suwama finished the Carnival group stage with 2 wins, 1 loss and 1 draw, which earned him 5 points.

On April 29, 2008, Suwama defeated Kensuke Sasaki to win the All Japan Triple Crown Championship.

Suwama first defended the Triple Crown on June 28, 2008, against Osamu Nishimura, beating Nishimura with the Last Ride. Suwama challenged Taiyo Kea and Minoru Suzuki on August 3, 2008 for the World Tag Team Championship teaming with Osamu Nishimura but did not win the belts. Suwama's second defense of the Triple crown was on August 31, 2008 versus Taiyo Kea it went to a 60-minute time limit draw. Suwama team up with Ryuji Hijikata in the All Asia Tag Team Championship tournament on January 2–3, 2009 to crown new All Asia Tag Team Champions. Suwama and Hijikata got eliminated in the first round of the tournament by losing to Satoshi Kojima and Kai when Kojima used a lariat on Hijikata. Suwama and Shuji Kondo defeated Joe Doering and Zodiac on March 1, 2009, to become the number one contenders for the World Tag Team Championship, but did not win the championship from Taiyō Kea and Minoru Suzuki. On August 29, 2010, Suwama defeated Minoru Suzuki to win the Triple Crown Heavyweight Championship for the second time. He would go on to lose the title to Jun Akiyama on October 23, 2011.

In later 2012, Suwama formed the Last Revolution tag team with Joe Doering, which in early 2013 was also joined by Kaz Hayashi, Shuji Kondo and Yasufumi Nakanoue. On March 17, Suwama defeated Masakatsu Funaki to win the Triple Crown Heavyweight Championship for the third time. In June, Joe Doering disbanded Last Revolution, when Kaz Hayashi and Shuji Kondo announced their resignation from All Japan following Nobuo Shiraishi taking over as the new president of All Japan and Keiji Mutoh leaving the promotion. While several other wrestlers also quit All Japan following the change in management, Suwama emerged as one of the first wrestlers to publicly show his support to Shiraishi, announcing that he was going to be staying in the promotion. In September, Suwama came back together with Joe Doering, with the two forming a tag team named "Evolution". On October 22, Evolution defeated Burning (Go Shiozaki and Jun Akiyama) to win the World Tag Team Championship, making Suwama the first "Quintuple Crown Champion" in 12 years. However, just five days later, Suwama lost the Triple Crown Heavyweight Championship to Akebono. On December 8, Evolution defeated Xceed (Go Shiozaki and Kento Miyahara) in the finals to win the 2013 World's Strongest Tag Determination League. On February 16, 2014, Hikaru Sato joined Suwama and Doering, turning Evolution into a stable. On June 28, Suwama and Doering lost the World Tag Team Championship to Wild Burning (Jun Akiyama and Takao Omori). However, the next day, Suwama defeated Omori to win the Triple Crown Heavyweight Championship for the fourth time. That same day Suwama was made a part of All Japan's new board of directors. He was later also given the title of "senior managing director". On July 27, Suwama lost the Triple Crown Heavyweight Championship to his Evolution stablemate Joe Doering. In December 2015, Suwama resigned from his senior managing director role. On January 2, 2016, Suwama defeated Jun Akiyama to win the Triple Crown Heavyweight Championship for the fifth time. However, Suwama was stripped of the title only ten days later after suffering an achilles tendon rupture.

Suwama returned to the ring on July 14, 2016. On September 19, Suwama defeated Zeus in the finals to win the 2016 Ōdō Tournament. Suwama would then unsuccessfully challenge the Triple Crown Heavyweight Champion Kento Miyahara on November 27. On September 23, 2017, Suwama won his second Ōdō Tournament in a row. On October 9, Suwama defeated Miyahara to win the Triple Crown for a record sixth time. He lost the title to Joe Doering on October 21.

On November 19, Suwama allied with Shuji Ishikawa to enter the World's Strongest Tag Determination League, which the two won by defeating Daichi Hashimoto and Hideyoshi Kamitani in the finals. On January 3, 2018, the two won the World Tag Team Championship by defeating Wild Burning (Takao Omori and Jun Akiyama). They dropped the belts to Kento Miyahara and Yoshi Tatsu on February 3.
Between April 7 and April 30, Suwama took part in the Champion Carnival, winning four matches and losing three. He was unable to reach the finals, but scored an important victory against eventual winner Naomichi Marufuji.

Championships and accomplishments 

 All Japan Pro Wrestling
 Triple Crown Heavyweight Championship (8 times)
 World Tag Team Championship (7 times) – with Joe Doering (1), Shuji Ishikawa (4), Shotaro Ashino (1) and Kono (1)
 Champion Carnival (2008)
 January 2 Korakuen Hall Heavyweight Battle Royal (2005)
 Mika Kayama Cup (2010) – with Shuji Kondo
 Ōdō Tournament (2016, 2017, 2021)
 Taiwan Cup (2009)
 World's Strongest Tag Determination League (2013) – with Joe Doering
 World's Strongest Tag Determination League (2015) – with Kento Miyahara
 World's Strongest Tag Determination League (2017, 2019) – with Shuji Ishikawa
 Nikkan Sports
 Best Bout (2011) – vs. Jun Akiyama on October 23
 Pro Wrestling Illustrated
 Ranked No. 14 of the best 500 singles wrestlers in the PWI 500 in 2011
 Tenryu Project
 Tenryu Project World 6-Man Tag Team Championship (1 time) – with Arashi and Tomohiro Ishii
 Tokyo Sports
 Outstanding Performance Award (2010)
 Tag Team of the Year (2006) with Taru, Shuji Kondo, and "brother" Yasshi
 Tag Team of the Year (2017, 2018, 2019) with Shuji Ishikawa

References

External links
 All Japan Pro Wrestling profile 

1976 births
Living people
Japanese male professional wrestlers
People from Fujisawa, Kanagawa
Professional wrestling executives
Japanese male sport wrestlers
21st-century professional wrestlers
World Tag Team Champions (AJPW)
Triple Crown Heavyweight Champions
Tenryu Project World 6-Man Tag Team Champions